Robert Pagliarini is the president of Pacifica Wealth Advisors, has earned a PhD in financial and retirement planning, is a certified financial planner, an enrolled agent with the IRS and the best-selling author of The Six-Day Financial Makeover: Transform Your Financial Life in Less Than a Week. He is a financial columnist for CBS MoneyWatch, The Huffington Post, Business Insider, AOL, Tribune Media Services and Forbes.

As president of Pacifica Wealth Advisors, Pagliarini specializes in serving sudden money recipients and helping clients overcome sudden wealth syndrome. The boutique wealth management firm is located in Orange County, CA.

Pagliarini has appeared as a financial advisor on 20/20, Good Morning America, Dr. Phil, ABC Morning News, NBC and NPR's Marketplace.  In print, he has appeared in the Wall Street Journal, Newsweek, BusinessWeek and Money Magazine.

In addition to his best-selling title, Pagliarini is also the author of Get Money Smart: Simple Lessons to Kickstart Your Financial Confidence & Grow Your Wealth, The Sudden Wealth Solution, The Other 8 Hours: Maximize Your Time to Create New Wealth and Purpose, and Plan Z: How to Survive the 2009 Financial Crisis (and even live a little better).

Pagliarini has a PhD in financial and retirement planning from The American College. He graduated in 1995 from Washington State University, with a bachelor's degree (BA) in Psychology. In 1999, he graduated from University of California, Los Angeles (UCLA) with certification in Personal Financial Planning. In 2004, Pagliarini completed his education at The American College, PA with a master's degree (MA) in Financial Services. In 2012 he earned a second master's degree – an MS degree in psychology – and in 2019 he earned a PhD.

Pagliarini currently resides in Mission Viejo, CA, with his wife and daughter.

References 

 Pacifica Wealth Advisors, http://www.pacificawealth.com/, retrieved 29 March 2010
 The Huffington Post, http://www.huffingtonpost.com/robert-pagliarini/, retrieved 27 March 2013
 Forbes, https://www.forbes.com/sites/robertpagliarini/#2e3207d24702, retrieved 18 May 2016
 Get Money Smart, https://www.amazon.com/Get-Money-Smart-Kickstart-Confidence/dp/099057153X, retrieved 15 August 2019
 The Sudden Wealth Solution, http://suddenwealthsolution.com/, retrieved 18 May 2016
 The Other 8 Hours: Maximize Your Time to Create New Wealth and Purpose, http://www.other8hours.com/, retrieved 29 March 2010

External links 
  - Pacifica Wealth Advisors 
 - The Other 8 Hours Official Website

Living people
The American College of Financial Services alumni
Year of birth missing (living people)